Illse Davids (born 26 March 1987 in Cape Town, South Africa) is a South African field hockey player. At the 2012 Summer Olympics she competed with the South Africa women's national field hockey team in the women's tournament.  She studied at the University of North Carolina and played for their hockey team. She obtained their Postgraduate Certificate in Education (PGCE), Stellenbosch University.

References

External links

Living people
1987 births
Field hockey players at the 2012 Summer Olympics
Olympic field hockey players of South Africa
South African female field hockey players
Field hockey players at the 2014 Commonwealth Games
Commonwealth Games competitors for South Africa
Sportspeople from Cape Town
Alumni of Wynberg Girls' High School
University of North Carolina alumni
Stellenbosch University alumni